Tadeusz Kowalczyk (5 January 1933 – 15 May 2022) was a Polish politician. A member of the Solidarity Citizens' Committee, he served in the Sejm from 1989 to 1993. He died on 15 May 2022 at the age of 89.

References

1933 births
2022 deaths
20th-century Polish politicians
20th-century Polish farmers
Members of the Contract Sejm
Solidarity Citizens' Committee politicians
Recipients of Cross of Freedom and Solidarity
People from Kielce County
University of Łódź alumni
21st-century farmers